Qaleh-ye Salvati (also Romanized as Qal‘eh-ye Şalvātī) is a village in Jastun Shah Rural District, Hati District, Lali County, Khuzestan Province, Iran. At the 2006 census, its population was 35, in 6 families.

References 

Populated places in Lali County